Monestiés (meaning monastery) is a commune in the Tarn department in southern France.

It is a member of the Les Plus Beaux Villages de France ("The Most Beautiful Villages of France") association.

Geography
The commune is traversed by the Cérou river.

See also
Communes of the Tarn department

References

Communes of Tarn (department)
Plus Beaux Villages de France